Janice Mirikitani (February 5, 1941 – July 29, 2021) was a Japanese–American poet and activist who resided in the San Francisco Bay Area for most of her adult life. She managed the Glide Memorial Church with her husband, Cecil Williams. She was noted for serving as San Francisco's poet laureate from 2000 until 2002.

Early life
Mirikitani was born in Stockton, California, on February 5, 1941 and was Sansei (third-generation Japanese American). Her parents, Shigemi and Ted Mirikitani, worked as chicken farmers in San Joaquin County. In 1942, during the World War II internment of Japanese Americans, she and her family were sent to the Rohwer War Relocation Center in Arkansas. Following the war, the family moved to Chicago.

After her parents divorced, Janice was brought back to a chicken farm at Petaluma, California, with her mother, where they would be near the remainder of their family. During the time that followed, Janice became the victim of sexual molestation by her step-father up to the age of sixteen, and was saved from suicide only by the love and care of her grandmother. She would later speak of the pain of her incestuous abuse through her poetry.

Mirikitani attended UCLA, earning a Bachelor of Arts degree. During this time, she struggled with her ethnic identity, which she would later portray through her poetry. After gaining her teaching credentials, she taught in the Contra Costa School District for a year. She worked at Glide Memorial Church in the Tenderloin district of San Francisco as an administrative assistant. She then entered graduate school for creative writing at San Francisco State University, but later discontinued her studies.

Political activities

After participating in the Asian American Political Alliance, she joined Third World Communications. She later co-founded and edited Aion – regarded as the first Asian American literary magazine – which published just two issues in 1970 before folding.  She edited two anthologies for Third World Communications: Third World Women (1972) and Time to Greez! Incantations from the Third World (1975). Mirikitani then became project director for Ayumi: A Japanese American Anthology (1980).

After two years of activism for Glide Memorial United Methodist Church in 1969 she became the program director. In 1982 Mirikitani married Cecil Williams, who was pastor of the church.  That same year she was chosen as the president of the Glide Foundation, where she was responsible for fund raising and budget oversight.  She was named the second poet laureate for the city of San Francisco in 2000, and she served in that role for two years. The California State Assembly named her "Woman of the Year" for the 17th Assembly District.

Personal life
Mirikitani had one child (Tianne Miller) from her first marriage. One of her cousins was the painter, Jimmy Mirikitani.

Mirikitani died on the morning of July 29, 2021, at the age of 80. The cause of death was cancer.

Bibliography

References

Further reading

External links

20th-century American women writers
21st-century American women writers
20th-century American poets
21st-century American poets
American women poets
American poets of Asian descent
Poets Laureate of San Francisco
Poets from California
American women writers of Asian descent
American writers of Japanese descent
Writers from San Francisco
Activists from San Francisco
American LGBT rights activists
Japanese-American civil rights activists
San Francisco State University alumni
Japanese-American internees
1941 births
2021 deaths